Sony AXN is a German language pay-TV channel from Sony Pictures Television that mainly offers feature films and series, as well as reality formats and lifestyle broadcasts. The German version of the international AXN was launched on 1 November 2004 and was known simply as "AXN" until October 2019.

Distribution and history
Sony AXN reaches 5.9 million subscribers via satellite (Sky, Austriasat), Kabel (Kabel Deutschland, Unitymedia, Kabelkiosk, Liwest, Cablecom), IPTV (Telekom Entertain, Swisscom, Sunrise, A1 Telekom) and online streaming (Magine TV).

An HD simulcast version can be received via Telekom Entertain since 1 February 2011. A Kabelkiosk connection took place on 26 June 2012, followed by Sky on 4 October 2012, and Kabel Deutschland on 15 October.

Since the beginning of September 2014, the channel has been shown in the payment service offered by the IPTV provider Magine TV.

On 8 September 2015, Sony Pictures Television announced that AXN Deutschland would also take over the new global design and channel logo. The conversion and takeover took place as of 9 October 2015.

On 24 October 2016, the distribution of the channel via Sky Deutschland in Germany and Austria ceased, as no agreement could be reached between Sony and Sky.

On 17 October 2019, the channel was renamed to "Sony AXN" and again adopted a new logo.

Programming

18 Wheels of Justice (Highway to Hell - 18 Räder aus Stahl) (2007-2009)
19-2 (2016–present)
Breaking Bad (2009-2015)
Californication (2008-2015)
Charlie's Angels (1976) (Drei Engel für Charlie) (2007-2009)
Charlie's Angels (2011) (Drei Engel für Charlie) (2012)
Chicago P.D. (2014–present)
Common Law (2014-2016)
Dexter (2009-2017)
Elementary (2014-2016)
Flashpoint (2013–present)
Full Metal Panic (2018–present)
F/X: The Series (2006-2008)
Gurren Lagann (2017–present)
Hannibal (2014–present)
Hawaii Five-O (1968) (Hawaii Fünf-Null) (2013-2015)
Highlander (2006-2008)
Homicide: Life on the Street (Homicide) (2006-2008)
House of Lies (2013-2017)
Hustle (Hustle - Unehrlich währt am längsten) (2015–present)
Ice (2018–present)
Justified (2014–present)
Kingdom (2015–present)
Knight Rider (1982) (2009-2011)
Knight Rider (2008) (2014-2016)
Kojak (2008–2011)
Lost Girl (2016)
Magnum, P.I. (Magnum) (2010-2013)
Métal Hurlant Chronicles (Schwermetall) (2018–present)
Michael Hayes (Michael Hayes - Für Recht und Gerechtigkeit) (2004-2006)
Police Rescue (Police Rescue - Gefährlicher Einsatz) (2006-2010)
Power (2015–present)
Relic Hunter (Relic Hunter - Die Schatzjägerin) (2006-2008)
RoboCop (Robocop - Die Serie) (2006-2008)
Rush (2015–present)
Sea Patrol (2015–present)
Seraph of the End (2016–present)
Sleeper Cell (2008-2010)
Snatch (2017–present)
Spooks (Spooks - Im Visier des MI5) (2015–present)
Starsky & Hutch (2007-2009)
The Agency (The Agency - Im Fadenkreuz der CIA) (2009-2011)
The District (The District - Einsatz in Washington) (2007-2009)
The Firm (Die Firma) (2014-2016)
The Oath (2018–present)
The Shield (The Shield - Gesetz der Gewalt) (2005–present)
The Streets of San Francisco (Die Straßen von San Francisco) (2013-2015)
True Justice (2012-2016)
Wolffs Revier (2013-2015)
L.A.'s Finest (2019–present)

References

External links
 

AXN
Television channels and stations established in 2004
2004 establishments in Germany
Television stations in Germany
Television stations in Austria
Television stations in Switzerland
German-language television stations
Sony Pictures Television
Mass media in Munich